The 2012 Adur District Council elections took place on 3 May 2012 to elect members of Adur District Council in West Sussex, England. Half of the council was up for election, and the Conservative Party remained in overall control of the council.

After the election, the composition of the council was:
Conservative 25 (no change)
Shoreham Beach Residents Association 2 (no change)
Labour 1 (+1)
Liberal Democrats 1 (-1)

Results
The election saw the Conservatives remain in overall control of the council after winning 13 of the 15 seats which were contested. They gained Eastbrook from the Liberal Democrats having lost it in a double vacancy at the 2010 elections, but this gain was offset by the loss of Cokeham to Labour, who thus gained their first representation on the council since 2006. In addition Labour saw their vote share rise by more than 12% across the district, whilst the UK Independence Party (UKIP) also saw their vote share increase. The Liberal Democrats were the main losers, seeing their vote fall by 14%, pushing their into fourth place, behind UKIP.

Ward results

References

Adur District Council: Elections May 2012 Adur District Council

2012
2012 English local elections
2010s in West Sussex